Wenatchee Heights is an unincorporated community in Chelan County, Washington, United States. Wentachee Heights is assigned the ZIP code 98801. 

Wenatchee Heights is on the Wenatchee Heights U.S. Geological Survey Map.

References

Unincorporated communities in Chelan County, Washington
Unincorporated communities in Washington (state)